Mohammed Yasser Mohamadi is a Qatari footballer of Egyptian descent who is a midfielder He was a member of the Qatar national football team.

His older brother Hussein Yasser, also a Qatari international, has had stints playing in Europe, notably with Manchester City and Manchester United.

References

External links
 
 Mohammad Yasser Mohammadi at Goalzz.com
 QSL.com.qa profile

1982 births
Living people
Al-Rayyan SC players
Qatar SC players
Al-Gharafa SC players
Al-Khor SC players
Umm Salal SC players
Al Kharaitiyat SC players
Muaither SC players
Qatar Stars League players
Qatari people of Egyptian descent
Qatari footballers
Footballers at the 2002 Asian Games
Association football midfielders
Naturalised citizens of Qatar
Asian Games competitors for Qatar